Phi Zeta is the only honor society of veterinary medicine in the United States.

History 
Phi Zeta was established at Cornell University in 1925 with the assistance of Dr. Veranus Alva Moore

Name and Symbols of the Society 
Greek Scholar, Dr. George P. Bristol of Cornell University, suggested that the organization use the Greek word, spelled in its Latin form: PHILOZOI; meaning “love for animals”.

The emblem was designed by the great artist and naturalist Louis Agassiz Fuertes

Purpose 
The purpose of Phi Zeta is to promote, acknowledge, and reward scholarship in the profession of veterinary medicine.

Membership 
Third-year students ranking in the top 10% of the class and fourth-year students ranking in the top 25% of the class are invited to become members.

Honorary membership may also be bestowed upon interns, residents, faculty, and non-veterinary field related persons who have made significant contributions to veterinary medicine.

Chapters 
Every veterinary school in the United States now has a chapter.  Chapters noted in bold are active, chapters in italics are dormant.

Alpha, Cornell University, 1925
Beta, University of Pennsylvania, 1929
Gamma, Iowa State University, 1931
Delta, Ohio State University, 1934
Epsilon, Auburn University, 1948
Zeta, Michigan State University, 1950
Eta, Texas A&M University, 1950
Theta, Colorado State University, 1950
Iota, Washington State University, 1952
Kappa, University of Minnesota, 1952
Lambda, University of California, 1953
Mu, University of Illinois, 1953
Nu, Oklahoma State University, 1958
Xi, University of Georgia, 1959
Omicron, Purdue University, 1962
Pi, University of Missouri, 1965
Rho, Tuskegee University, 1967
Sigma, Kansas State University, 1969
Tau, Louisiana State University, 1977
Upsilon, University of Florida, 1979
Phi, University of Tennessee, 1979
Chi, Virginia-Maryland Regional CVM, 1984
Psi, North Carolina State University, 1984
Alpha Alpha, University of Wisconsin, 1987
Alpha Gamma, Oregon State University, 1987
Omega, Mississippi State University, 1988
Alpha Beta, Tufts University, 1991
Alpha Delta, St. George's University, 2006
Alpha Epsilon, Western University of Health Sciences, 2006
Alpha Zeta, Ross University School of Veterinary Medicine, 2014
Alpha Eta, Midwestern University College of Veterinary Medicine, 2017
Alpha Theta, Lincoln Memorial University, 2018

References

See also
 
  – Alpha Psi – veterinary medicine (professional fraternity)
  – Omega Tau Sigma – veterinary medicine  (professional fraternity)

Honor societies
Veterinary organizations
Student organizations established in 1925
1925 establishments in New York (state)
Veterinary medicine in the United States